The Fairfax Arms, also known as the Colchester Inn, is a historic inn and tavern located at Colchester, Fairfax County, Virginia.  It was built in the mid-18th century, and is a 1 1/2-story, three bay, brick building measuring approximately 25 feet by 32 feet. It features flanking exterior stone chimneys and a gable roof with dormers.

Long privately owned, the house was purchased by the Fairfax County Park Authority in 2021.

It was listed on the National Register of Historic Places in 1979.

References

External links

Colchester Inn, 10712 Old Colchester Road, Lorton, Fairfax County, VA: 7 photos and 2 data pages at Historic American Buildings Survey

Historic American Buildings Survey in Virginia
Drinking establishments on the National Register of Historic Places in Virginia
Buildings and structures in Fairfax County, Virginia
National Register of Historic Places in Fairfax County, Virginia